Universal Championship may refer to:

APW Universal Heavyweight Championship, the top championship of All Pro Wrestling
WWC Universal Heavyweight Championship, the world championship of World Wrestling Council
WWE Universal Championship, the world championship of WWE's SmackDown brand
DDT Universal Championship, a championship of DDT Pro-Wrestling